The Coles Tournament was a golf tournament held in Australia in 1959 and 1960. The events were held at Huntingdale Golf Club, Melbourne. Total prize money was A£3,000 in 1959 and A£5,000 in 1960. The sponsor was Coles Stores, an Australian retailer.

Winners

References

Golf tournaments in Australia
Recurring sporting events established in 1959
Recurring events disestablished in 1960